Greek National Road 59 (abbr: EO59) is a national highway in northeastern Greece. It connects the Greek National Road 12 at Mesorrachi with the Greek National Road 2 near Amfipoli, via Draviskos.

References

59
Roads in Central Macedonia